Samuel Leigh Rainbird (born 5 June 1992) is an Australian cricketer. He is a left-arm fast bowler, and currently plays for Tasmania and the Melbourne Stars.

Before his first contract with Tasmania in 2011, Rainbird played Australian Rules Football for the Clarence Football Club in the Tasmanian Football League. He was born in Hobart and was educated at MacKillop College and Guilford Young College.

In March 2022, during the 2021–22 Sheffield Shield season, Rainbird took eight wickets for 21 runs against Queensland, recording the best bowling figures for Tasmania in a first-class match. Rainbird then took a five-wicket haul in the second innings of the match, to give him the best match figures for Tasmania in the Sheffield Shield with 13 for 42.

References

Living people
1992 births
Tasmania cricketers
Cricketers from Hobart
Australian cricketers
Hobart Hurricanes cricketers
Sydney Thunder cricketers
Melbourne Stars cricketers
Clarence Football Club players